The electoral division of McIntyre is one of the fifteen electorates in the Tasmanian Legislative Council, it includes Flinders Island, the northern east coast of Tasmania, and regional areas south and west of Launceston. It is named after Margaret McIntyre, who was the first woman to be elected into the Parliament of Tasmania in 1948.

There were temporarily two representatives for the single-member division of McIntyre until 2018. The next scheduled periodic election will be held in 2022.

History and electoral profile
The division was created following the 2016–17 Legislative Council redistribution process. The new name of McIntyre was adopted to avoid confusion because of the significant changes made to the electoral boundaries in the region.

McIntyre includes all of the Flinders, Dorset, Break O'Day municipal areas and part of Kentish, Meander Valley and Northern Midlands municipal areas.

Members

As a result of the changes made following the 2016–17 Legislative Council redistribution process, the single-seat electorate of McIntyre was temporarily assigned two MLCs, Greg Hall and Tania Rattray, until the expiration of Hall's term in 2018. The expiration of Hall's term coincided with the 2018 periodic elections where a member for the new division of Prosser was elected.

See also

 Tasmanian House of Assembly
 Electoral division of Apsley (former electorate)
 Electoral division of Western Tiers (former electorate)

References

External links
Parliament of Tasmania
Tasmanian Electoral Commission – Legislative Council

McIntyre